This is a list of electoral results for the Electoral district of North-East Coolgardie in Western Australian state elections.

Members for North-East Coolgardie

Election results

Elections in the 1890s

References

Western Australian state electoral results by district